Antonio Da Valditaro (died 1491) was a Roman Catholic prelate who served as Bishop of Brugnato (1478–1491).

In 1478, Antonio Da Valditaro was appointed during the papacy of Pope Sixtus IV as Bishop of Brugnato.
He served as Bishop of Brugnato until his death in 1491.

References

External links and additional sources
 (for Chronology of Bishops) 
 (for Chronology of Bishops) 

15th-century Italian Roman Catholic bishops
Bishops appointed by Pope Sixtus IV
1491 deaths